Africa is an epic poem in Latin hexameters by the 14th-century Italian poet Petrarch (Francesco Petrarca). It tells the story of the Second Punic War, in which the Carthaginian general Hannibal invaded Italy, but Roman forces were eventually victorious after an invasion of north Africa led by Publius Cornelius Scipio Africanus, the epic poem's hero.

Background 

Africa and De viris illustribus were partially inspired by Petrarch's visit to Rome in 1337. According to Bergin and Wilson (p. ix). It seems very likely that the inspirational vision of the Eternal City must have been the immediate spur to the design of the Africa and probably De viris illustribus as well. After returning from his grand tour, the first sections of Africa were written in the valley of Vaucluse. Petrarch recalls

The fact that he abandoned it early on is not entirely correct since it was far along when he received two invitations (from Rome and from Paris) in September 1340 each asking him to accept the crown as poet laureate. A preliminary form of the poem was completed in time for the laurel coronation April 8, 1341 (Easter Sunday).

Petrarch spoke of this

It could easily be inferred from this wording that the epic poem was far enough along to receive this flattering colloquy. By 1343 the work was provvisoriamente finished as we have it today worldwide. Petrarch had been with the court of Cardinal Giovanni Colonna in the days he lived at Avignon around 1330. He was ordained in the Catholic priesthood, as capellanus continuous, in the lower ranks. He received additional support from the Roman Colonna dynasty for his work on Cornelius Scipio.

Examination 

Petrarch's epic poem was dedicated to Robert of Naples, king of Sicily. The king gave him a three-day oral examination at his residence a few days prior to see if he was qualified to receive the laurel crown. King Robert's examination and the legal document privilegium laureations  shows the ceremony was a medieval academic event; however, Petrarch intended this grand event to be a new age - the Renaissance, a time of rebirth of the Roman classical traditions of twelve hundred years before. The symbolism of the event among the loco ipso (ruins of classical Rome) was a resurrection event, a day to start bringing back the classical era.

Coronation 
Petrarch's "Coronation Oration" (a.k.a. Collatio laureationis) is the formal public speech of acceptance by him of the title poet laureate on April 8, 1341 (Easter Sunday), for his work on Africa about Cornelius Scipio. Petrarch's speech, given in the form of a medieval sermon, demonstrates the gradual transition from the Middle Ages to the Renaissance. It is considered the first manifesto of the Renaissance. Petrarch looked at his laureateship as political. In his grand speech he said of the description of his laurel that it was ...equally appropriate of Caesars and poets. It was a triumphal event where trumpets were blared. King Robert gave Petrarch a special robe to wear in honor of this event. He was given the titles of "poet," "master," "professor" of poetry and history and "the most famous private citizen then living." At the time of the coronation, the Africa consisted of just a few books (maybe four out of the nine written).

Petrarch points out his work needed some final touches, because in the Metrical Letter at the coronation he wrote
The little book itself, now growing bold,
Burns with desire to run and cast itself
Before those sacred feet,
and day and night,
pleads for release

Petrarch speaks of other famous poets in his "coronation oration" (privilegium laureationis)

Influences

Historical foundation 
Petrarch's reference to Livy places much value in the historical integrity of his Africa and sets the groundwork as being true past events. The main plot, being the ancient historical events of the Second Punic War, are taken directly from Livy's extensive Roman work of the "Foundation of the City" Books 21 to 30. The coronation for the historical work of Cornelius Scipio and the Second Punic War in the Africa shows the creditability and trust for Petrarch. He was later labelled "father of humanism" for the reconstruction of Livy's records that he did on various previously lost versions. The Africa has particular historical value because it contains Petrarch's ideas about Roman history and the current state of Italian life then.

Virgil's Aeneid 
Petrarch intended his epic poem to be a new Aeneid. The general theme of the Aeneid is followed by Petrarch's story of the hero Cornelius Scipio. The Aeneid not only provided Petrarch with a rhetorical cultivation but also with a collection of epic emotions to work from. The Aeneid and the Africa complement each other, as the former describes the foundation of Rome and the latter Rome's rise to world power.

Scipio's Dream 
Livy and Cicero's version of the Dream of Scipio, which are rebuilt in the poem, complement each other and are sources of the Africa. The dream shapes the context from which the poem is to be understood. Scipio's love for justice drove him to avenge his father's and uncle's death by the Carthaginians.

Divine Comedy 
Petrarch very likely was influenced by Dante's Divine Comedy for his Africa. Dante's prestigious work was well known and surely a challenge to him. Dante's remarks of praise of medieval heroes in his Comedia, Convivio, Espitole and De monarchia also had an influence on Petrarch.

Sophonisba 
Livy (30.12.11-15.11) is the historical source of Sophonisba, however the poetic design is based on Virgil's Aeneid. Petrarch intentionally did this to increase the importance of Sophonisba to the level of a new Dido (queen of Carthage). In Book 6 Sophonisba is captured by the poem's hero, Cornelius Scipio. She commits suicide so she does not become Scipio's nor Rome's war prize.  Here she shows her love for Massinissa. There is a fundamental difference between Virgil's Aeneid and Petrarch's Africa. Virgil's Dido blames Rome for the ruin of herself as does Sophonisba. In Petrarch's poem the hero, Scipio, does not come to an end.

Africanus 
Petrarch could have chosen between Julius Caesar and Cornelius Scipio for a great Roman hero to write about and decided on Scipio. Caesar's life did not represent Christian values that he wanted to convey to the reader. Cornelius Scipio, the hero of the poem, received the agnomen (nickname) of Africanus for defeating Hannibal and the Carthaginians. The title for the poem Africa is based on the nickname of the hero. The adopted grandson of the poem's hero is Scipio Aemilianus, also known as Cornelius Scipio Aemilianus Africanus – receiving his like agnomen for destroying Carthage at the end of the Third Punic War.

Ecerinis 
Petrarch's irresistible desire to imitate the ancients was probably influenced by Albertino Mussato's Latin tragic play Ecerinis, which was modeled on Seneca the Younger's tragedy works.

Composition 

Petrarch's Africa was conceived as a classical Latin poetic counterpart and the highlight of his similar De viris illustribus about famous men of ancient times. Many of the subjects of Africa are also found in De viris illustribus which is based on Livy's extensive History of Rome. Petrarch wrote his historical Latin epic in the spirit of the main character of De viris illustribus, Cornelius Scipio Africanus. In the De viris illustribus he wrote a Vita Scipionis (Life of Scipio) to serve as a historical backdrop for the main character. Cornelius Scipio, the hero of Petrarch's epic poem, also appears in other of Petrarch's works such as Rhymes, Triumphs, and De otio religiosorum.

Petrarch conceived his Africa as a poetic parallel of his De viris illustribus ("Illustrious Men"), that he was working on simultaneously. The Africa was inspired by Virgil and depended heavily on information that he was able to get from Livy and Cicero. He was at the high point of presenting himself as the poet historian intellectual of his time. There were two Scipios spoken about in Petrarch's epic poem. They were Scipio the Elder (235 B.C. - 183 B.C.) and his grandson Scipio the Younger (185 B.C. - 129 B.C.). Cornelius Scipio the Elder is the main character and is the victor of the Second Punic War. He had the reputation of a chaste and temperate man. Scipio the Younger is the victor of the Third Punic War and razed Carthage. Both had the nickname "Africanus". Petrarch added the "bio" of Julius Caesar, De gestis Cesaris ("On the Deeds of Caesar"), later as the twenty-fourth and last character in the 1360s as an afterthought as the others were done in 1342–43 at Vaucluse. He mentions in letters from Vaucluse around 1350 that he was working on a De viris illustribus that was wholly committed to those who were illustrious "from every country" and that he was "bringing together illustrious men from all lands and centuries."  This is referenced in his Familiares 8.3 edited in 1351–52. This is known to scholars as an "all-ages" plan. Because of this research for De viris illustribus and the Africa,
encyclopedic and other sources refer to Petrarch as the first geographer and cartographer of modern times.

Petrarch conceived his first plan for De viris illustribus of biographies of illustrious men of Jewish, oriental, Greek and Roman famous figures in 1337 before that of the Africa. Scholars say Petrarch more than likely conceived Africa in 1338 based on this initial research of Lives for De viris illustribus. He wrote up his list of "Illustrious Men" from Adam to Julius Caesar and Romulus to Titus in 1337–38, about the same time as he was writing his Africa (1338–39). Petrarch's earliest reference to writing a series of biographies of Lives can be found in the third book of his work Secretum which was originally written up around 1337. St. Augustine speaks to Petrarch

It seems like Petrarch had the idea to write up a list of biographies of Roman leaders ("Illustrious Men") from the republican period before that of the Africa. Petrarch was preoccupied with this idea of a series of biographies of Lives of ancient heroes (De viris illustribus) of generals and statesmen for almost forty years until his death and can be viewed as part of his total intellectual development. There were several plans of De viris illustribus. In 1348-49 Petrarch made a larger version of Lives in his work on these Famous Men. Petrarch then went from these Lives of "Illustrious Men" into his work on the Africa using the research of De viris illustribus as the bases. Petrarch writes a letter to Luca Cristiani in 1349 concerning these Lives for De viris illustribus and his epic poem Africa that he was doing in the valley at Vaucluse;

Petrarch saw his task in writing these two great endeavors as describing illustrious men, not lucky ones. He wanted to depict events that were controlled by them, not events that happened by luck or fortune.  He wanted to be a critical historian and convey these illustrious men in dignity. For these reasons he is considered the first historian of the Renaissance.

Poetic structure 
Petrarch wrote his nine book epic poem in hexameters, the standard metre for Epic in Classical Latin and consisting of six metrical feet. Petrarch probably intended his incomplete poem to be twelve books total based on Virgil's Aeneid, (also in hexameters). The main story centers around the time period of the Spanish campaign (205 BC) to the end of the Battle of Zama (202 BC). This is based on Livy's third decade of his History of Rome.

Petrarch uses the Dream of Scipio as a beginning point to his epic poem in Books 1 and 2. He presents Scipio as the center figure. From here in Books 3 and 4 he gives the history of Scipio's friend Gaius Laelius being sent to Syphax to negotiate becoming a Roman ally and break off the relations with the Carthaginians. Book 5 and 6 then gives the history of Sophonisba, a new Dido (Queen of Carthage). Book 7 gives the history of the Battle of Zama. Book 8 gives the history of the defeat of Carthage which concludes the Second Punic War. Book 9 shows Scipio returns to Rome for his triumphal victory celebration at the steps of the Capitol.

Synopsis 
Petrarch's original conception as a goal for his epic poem was to bring back the glorious days of ancient Rome. There was a clash however between this fame for glory at his coronation and Christian values he was trying to impart to his readers. The story of the death of Mago Barcid (Book 6) and the Dream of Scipio (Books 1 and 2) entered in at this point. In the 1350s Petrarch reworked the Africa extensively to reflect this. These events ultimately established the main concepts of the poem. Petrarch was writing his third book of the Secretum, a sort of self investigation of moral values especially as it related to fame, structured as an imaginary dialogue with Saint Augustine, also in the 1350s. From this developed the Secretum's Africa, a conflict between the vanity of the glory for Rome and Christian values.

Petrarch also set the rewritting in the 1350s in relation to events that recently happened. The Black Death pandemic killed many of his friends, including his former patron and master Cardinal Stefano Colonna the Elder in 1348. In the revised version of his epic poem he makes references to his close friend king Robert of Naples (Book 9, 423–427).  He portrays the concept that because of king Robert's death in 1343 that all hope is lost for a continuation of a renaissance that was initiated at the coronation sponsored by the king. Petrarch grieves over the momentum king Robert initiated for a "rebirth" of cultural values that is now lost. He gives hope, however, that in future centuries that the Africa will be rediscovered and enjoy its own "rebirth" alongside the glory of ancient Roman moral pursuits.

Critical reception and impact 
Petrarch worked on his epic poem 1338-39 and 1343–44, however guarded it with his life and did not allow it to be circulated since he considered it unfinished. Petrarch continued to work on the Africa even after his coronation as poet laureate. He worked on his epic poem to the end of his life in 1374.  There was then a struggle over who would have the honor of bringing out the authoritative version of Petrarch's famous poem. The competition became intense, especially between the humanists of Florence and Padua.
 The text was finally made public by Pier Paolo Vergerio in 1396–1397, over two decades after his death. He officially published the first text of the Africa. There are 17 extant fifteenth century copies of the Africa, which shows how widely popular the poem was as a school textbook.

Generally speaking however, the literary world gave little attention to Petrarch's epic poem and it was viewed as just a minor curiosity.  The first publication to the public was not until 1397. When Silius Italicus epic poem Punica, also about the Second Punic War, was discovered in the fifteenth century it overshadowed Petrarch's medieval style Africa because the audience then loved classical works like Italicus'. Various editions of Petrarch's Opera Omnia (collected Latin works) from 1501 onward were little acknowledged or read.

Leon Pingaud produced the first serious scholarly edition in Paris in 1872 and even it was done with little thought. Needless to say his work did little to the already long time tarnished reputation of the Africa. Francesco Corradini also put out a scholarly edition and it was more sympathetic, but did little to improve the already blemished reputation.  Nicola Festa published a massive edition in 1926 and also a thesis Saggio sull’ Africa del Petrarca. His edition was clearer and much more like what Petrarch intended. These works by Festa received high marks in scholarly journals. Petrarch's Africa has had an increase in interest in Latin countries, however little reader interest elsewhere. A serious English scholarly work was done by Aldo Bernardo in 1962. Thomas G. Bergin and Alice Wilson published their English translation and commentary in 1977. The Renaissance scholars Bergin and Wilson have the only complete English translation. Other than these works few articles have been written on Petrarch's epic poem in English, however there have been various serious scholarly works written in the twentieth and twenty-first centuries in French, Italian, and German.

To Petrarch, his Africa was his croce e delizia for the rest of his life. Petrarch set great store by Africa and his other classicizing works, but the epic was not particularly well-received because of the literary transposition from Livy; the two parts of the death of Magone and the love story of Sofonisba have been rather better received.

Historians show how it was quite likely that Petrarch met Chaucer and that the Africa and other of Petrarch's works influenced works of Chaucer, especially certain episodes of Canterbury Tales.

Scholar Aldo Bernardo in his book Petrarch, Scipio, and the Africa argues emphatically that Petrarch's chief thought considerations were not of Laura, but that of his epic poem's hero - Cornelius Scipio.

Publication history 
The editio princeps of the Africa was first published and printed, as part of Petrarch's collected works (Opera omnia) at Venice in 1501. Petrarch's epic poem was printed again as a Venetian edition in 1503. There were also in 1554 to 1558 Basel editions printed which forms the basis for all later editions. In 1872 it received special treatment in Paris by L. Pingaud. In 1874 came an edition by Francesco Corradini from Padua. In 1884, by V.Develay, in Paris. Nicola Festa produced a critical edition in 1926, L'Africa, in Florence. The only complete English edition of the twentieth century is Petrarch's Africa translation and annotated by  Thomas G. Bergin and Alice S. Wilson of Yale University Press (1977).

Partial translations and commentary editions
 Latin,  1558.  Bucolica, Africa, Epistolae ... Basel
 Italian, 1570.  L'Africa del Petrarca ... in ottava rima insieme col testo Latino, ... tradotta da by F. Marretti. [Containing only books 1 to 3.].
 Italian, 1776. Dell'Africa di Francesco Petrarca libro primo, volgarizzato da Egle Euganea. by Fratelli Conzatti: Padua.
 Latin, 1874, Africa Francisci Petrarchae nunc primum emendata, by Francesco Corradini Padua.
 Italian, 1874. L'Africa recata in versi italiani dal dottor Agostino Palesa, edited by A. Zardo, Padova.
 Italian, 1874. L'Africa, poema epico in esametri latini ... into Italian verse by G. B. Gando.
 French, 1880. Pétrarque. Sophonisbe, épisode du poème de UAfrique ; traduit pour la première fois by Victor Develay. Paris
 Swedish, 1889. Afrika : episk dikt. Publisher: Göteborg : Göteborgs Handelstidnings Aktiebolags Tryckeri
 Italian, 1925. Antologia petrarchesca : Canzoniere, Trionfi, Secretum, Epistole famigliari e senili, Africa, Egloghe, Epistole metriche by  Giuseppe Morpurgo. Milan
 Italian, 1926. L'Africa / dc Franceso Petrarca ; edizione critica per cura di Nicolo Festa ; corredata di un ritratto e cinque tavole fuori testo by Nicola Festa. Florence, Italy.
 Italian, 1933 L'"Africa" di Francesco Petrarca, in versi italiani di Agostino Barolo (con introduzione) by Agostino Baroli, Torino
 English, 1962. Petrarch, Scipio and the "Africa"; the birth of humanism's dream by Aldo S Bernardo, Baltimore, Johns Hopkins Press
 English, 1973. Africa et Bucolica by Johannes, de Vellate. East Ardsley, Wakefield, West Yorkshire, England. Microform Academic Publishers
 English, 1979  Review of Petrarch's Africa. Review of Francesco Petrarca: Canzone from First to Final Version by Janet L Smarr. JSTOR - Renaissance Quarterly, Autumn, vol. 32, no. 3, p. 364-367
 Multiple languages, 1998. L'Africa : edizione critica, Florence
 French, 2002. L'Afrique : 1338-1374 by Rebecca Lenoir. Publisher: Grenoble : J. Millon.
 French, 2006. L'Afrique. Affrica. I-V edited and translated in alexandrine verses by Pierre Laurens, Paris, Les Belles Lettres.
 German, 2007. Africa: Kommentarband by Bernhard Huss and Gerhard Regn, Dieterich'sche Verlagsbuchhandlung
 English, 2007 Petrarch's Africa I-IV : a translation and commentary by Erik Z D Ellis, Waco, Texas. Baylor University
 French, 2018. L'Afrique. Affrica. IV-IX edited and translated in alexandrine verses by Pierre Laurens, Paris, Les Belles Lettres.

Footnotes

Primary sources

Cicero 

 De re publica (Somnium Scipionis, or Dream of Scipio), Book 6

Livy 

 From the Founding of the City, Books 20-30
(Third Samnite War, Battle of Cannae, Second Punic War, Third Punic War)

Virgil 

 Aeneid

Petrarch 
Canzoniere ("Rhymes")
Secretum ("My Secret Book")
Bucolicum carmen ("Pastoral Poems")
De vita solitaria ("On the Solitary Life")
De viris illustribus ("On Illustrious Men")
Liber sine nomine ("Book without a name")
Letter to Posterity
De otio religiosorum ("On Religious Leisure")
Rerum memorandarun libri ("Books on Matters to be Remembered")
De remediis utriusque fortunae ("On Remedies for Fortune Fair and Foul")
Invectivae contra medicum quendam ("Investives against a Certain Doctor")
Epistolae familiares ("Letters to Familiars")
 (Based on edition of Le familiari, Vittorio Rossi and Umberto Bosco, Le Lettere, 1997)

Secondary sources 
Bergin, Thomas G. and Wilson, Alice S., Petrarch's Africa English translation.  New Haven. Yale University Press 1977. 
Bernardo, Aldo S., Petrarch, Scipio, and the "Africa": the birth of humanism's dream. Johns Hopkins Press, 1962. pp. 127–167
Biese, Alfred, The development of the feeling for nature in the Middle Ages and modern times, G. Routledge & Sons, ltd., 1905
Brown, Virginia, Famous women  translation, Harvard University Press, 2001, 
Corradini, Francisco, Africa Francisci Petrarchae nunc primum emendata, In Padova a Francesco Petrarca net Quinto Centenario dalla sua morte. Padova: Premiata Tipografia del Seminario, 1874.
Develay, Victor, L'Afrique, Gautier, 1893
Develay, Victor, Le Livre, volume 6, 1885, pp. 278–288. French translation of Petrarch's Coronation Oration.
Encyclopædia Britannica,  a dictionary of arts, sciences, and general literature, Volume 13 (edition 9), Maxwell Sommerville, 1894
Ellis, Erik Z D,  Petrarch's Africa I-IV : a translation and commentary eBook online by Baylor University, 2007
Everson, Jane E., The Italian romance epic in the age of humanism: the matter of Italy and the world of Rome, Oxford University Press, 2001, 
Festa, Nicola, Saggio sull' "Africa" del Petrarca, Volume 113 of Biblioteca Sandron di scienze e lettere, H. Sandron, 1926
Giordano, Antonio and John, Francesco Petrarch and Africa (Literary Criticism), Typography Gentile, 1890
Hortis, Attilio, Scritti inediti di Francesco Petrarca Latin text of Petrarch's Coronation Oration, Trieste, 1874.
Howard, Donald R., Chaucer, His Life, His Works, His World, E. P. Dutton, 1987, 
Jackson, William T. H., European Writers, The Middle Ages and the Renaissance, Volume 2 (Petrarch to Renaissance short fiction), Charles Scibner's Sons, 1983, 
Kirkham, Victoria, Petrarch: a critical guide to the complete works, University of Chicago Press, 2009, 

Marretti, Fabio, Le rime e L'Africa, E. Perino, 1890
Marretti, Fabio, L' Africa: in Ottava Rima insieme col testo Latino, Farri, 1570
Morley, Henry, English writers: an attempt towards a history of English literature, Volume 4, Cassell & Company, 1889
Palesa, Agosa,  Africa: visited Italian verse by Dr. Augustine Palesa F. Sacchetto, 1874, translated by Google translate toolbar.

Robinson, James Harvey, Petrarch, the first modern scholar and man of letters: a selection from his correspondence with Boccaccio and other friends, designed to illustrate the beginnings of the Renaissance, G.P. Putnam's Sons, 1907
Scanlon, Larry, Narrative, Authority and Power: The Medieval Exemplum and the Chaucerian Tradition, Volume 20 of Cambridge Studies in Medieval Literature, CUP, 2007, 
Tillyard, Eustace Mandeville Wetenhall, The English epic and its background, Chatto and Windus, 1954
Toffanin, Giuseppe, History of humanism, Las Americas Publishing, 1954
Wade, Herbert Treadwell, The New international encyclopaedia, Volume 18, Dodd, Mead and company, 1922
Warner, James Christopher, The Augustinian epic, Petrarch to Milton, University of Michigan Press, 2005, 
Wilkins, Ernest H., The making of the "Canzoniere" and other Petrarchan studies, Chapter II "The Coronation of Petrarch", Edizioni di Storia e letteratura, 1951
Wilkins, Ernest H., Petrarch's coronation oration, Modern Language Association of America., 1953
Wilkins, Ernest H., "Descriptions of pagan divinities from Petrarch to Chaucer" in Speculum vol. 32 (1957) pp. 511–522.

External links
 Latin text of Petrarch's Africa, ed. Léonce Pingaud, Paris, 1872 (archive.org)
 Latin text in HTML format: Itinera Electronica (with concordances and French translation by Victor Develay); single-page text
 Petrarch's Africa I-IV: a translation and commentary, by Erik Z.D. Ellis (M.A. thesis in History, Baylor University, 2007)
 Outline of contents in the Latin Vicipaedia

Epic poems in Latin
Second Punic War
1341 books
1343 books
1396 books
Poetry by Petrarch
Medieval poetry
Historical poems
Cultural depictions of Hannibal
Cultural depictions of Scipio Africanus